John Dunlop Millen (3 May 1877 – 1 August 1941) was an Australian engineer and politician. He served as a Senator for Tasmania from 1920 to 1938, representing the Nationalist Party until 1931 and then the United Australia Party (UAP). He managed the Mount Bischoff tin mine before entering politics and served a term as president of the Institution of Engineers, Australia.

Early life
Millen was born on 3 May 1877 in Derry, Ireland. He was the son of Kate (née Dickson) and John Millen. The family immigrated to the Colony of Queensland in 1884, settling in Toowoomba where his father worked as a draper.

Millen attended Toowoomba Grammar School and obtained a diploma from Sydney Technical College. In 1903 he moved to Launceston, Tasmania, to work as a metallurgist for the Mount Bischoff Tin Mining Company smelting works. He was also a consultant for the Renison Bell mine and an advisory engineer to the Vacuum Oil Company of Australia. In 1907, Millen was appointed manager of the Mount Bischoff mine at Waratah. He held the position until 1919 and was "credited with the modernisation of the mine’s facilities and was regarded by all those associated with the mine’s operations as an effective manager".

Politics
Millen was elected to the Senate at the 1919 federal election, standing as a Nationalist. He received the highest vote in the state, and was re-elected at the 1925 and 1931 elections, joining the United Australia Party (UAP) upon its formation. His term began on 1 July 1920 and concluded on 30 June 1938 following his defeat at the 1937 election.

In the Senate, Millen was known for his committee work, including service on the Joint Committee on Public Accounts (1920–1925) and the select committee into the government's proposed agreement with Amalgamated Wireless (Australasia) for expanding radio communications between Australia and the UK. According to Robert Menzies, his most important work was as chairman of the Royal Commission on National Insurance which sat between 1923 and 1927. The government's National Insurance Bill 1928 adopted many of the committee's recommendations, but ultimately failed to pass before its defeat in 1929. Millen "had a particular interest in technological subjects, including the development of the Commonwealth Council for Scientific and Industrial Research". He stood for President of the Senate in 1935 but was not successful.

Other activities
Millen was a foundation member of the Institution of Engineers, Australia (IEA), serving on its council and as its fifth president in 1924. He also served on the main committee of the Australian Commonwealth Engineering Standards Association. He was a director of  Amalgamated Wireless (Australasia) and the Australian Provincial Assurance Association, and shortly before his death he became the managing director of the Hadfields Steel Works at Alexandria, New South Wales.

Personal life
Millen married Janet May Scott in 1906, with whom he had three sons. He suffered from diabetes and was absent from the Senate due to health reasons on a number of occasions. He died in Launceston on 1 August 1941, aged 64.

References

Nationalist Party of Australia members of the Parliament of Australia
United Australia Party members of the Parliament of Australia
Members of the Australian Senate for Tasmania
1877 births
1941 deaths
20th-century Australian politicians
Irish emigrants to Australia (before 1923)
Australian mining engineers
Australian metallurgists
People from Toowoomba